Hrynky is a village in Kremenchuk Raion of Poltava Oblast in Ukraine.

History
Hrynky was formed in the late 17th/early 18th century by escaped serfs who settled here. In 1780, the village consisted of 53 huts, which grew to 189 households with 1245 residents by 1859.

Hrynky was previously located in the Hlobyne Raion until it was abolished on 18 July 2020 as part of the administrative reform of Ukraine, which reduced the number of raions of Poltava Oblast to four. The area of Hlobyne Raion was merged into Kremenchuk Raion.

Geography

Demographics
Native language as of the Ukrainian Census of 2001:
 Ukrainian 97.37%
 Russian 2.5%

Notable people
Mykola Lysenko (1842-1912), composer.

References

Villages in Kremenchuk Raion